The 2017 Betway Premier League Darts was a darts tournament organised by the Professional Darts Corporation – the thirteenth edition of the tournament. The event began on Thursday 2 February at the Metro Radio Arena in Newcastle and ended with the Play-offs at The O2 Arena in London on Thursday 18 May. This was the fourth year that the tournament was sponsored by Betway.

Michael van Gerwen, the 2016 champion, retained his title by winning the last-leg decider against Peter Wright in the final, after Wright missed six darts to win 11–9. Kim Huybrechts became the first player in Premier League Darts history to fail to win a match in the tournament.

Format
The tournament format is identical to that since 2013. During the first nine weeks (Phase 1) each player plays the other nine players once. The bottom two players are then eliminated from the competition. In the next six weeks (phase 2) each player plays the other seven players once. Phase 2 consists of four weeks where five matches are played followed by two weeks where four matches are played. At the end of phase 2 the top four players contest the two semi-finals and the final in the play-off week.

Venues
In the only change from 2016, Brighton returned to the calendar, replacing Bournemouth.

Players
The players in this year's tournament were announced following the 2017 PDC World Darts Championship final on 2 January 2017, with the top four of the PDC Order of Merit joined by six Wildcards – two chosen by Sky Sports and four by the PDC.

Previous PDC wildcards Robert Thornton and Michael Smith were dropped in favour of Jelle Klaasen and Kim Huybrechts. The 2017 edition marks the first time in which the six-time champion Phil Taylor appears as a wildcard entry, having finished outside the Order of Merit places. It is also the first Premier League without a player making his debut in the competition.

Prize money 
The prize-money was increased to £825,000 from £725,000 in 2016.

League stage

2 February – Week 1 (Phase 1)
 Metro Radio Arena, Newcastle

9 February – Week 2 (Phase 1)
 Motorpoint Arena, Nottingham

16 February – Week 3 (Phase 1)
 First Direct Arena, Leeds

23 February – Week 4 (Phase 1)
 Brighton Centre, Brighton

2 March – Week 5 (Phase 1)
 Westpoint Arena, Exeter

<small>*Michael van Gerwen was originally scheduled to play against James Wade, but withdrew due to a back injury, Dave Chisnall played twice in Round 5. Van Gerwen played Wade on 23 March (Round 8), giving Chisnall the night off.

9 March – Week 6 (Phase 1)
 The SSE Hydro, Glasgow

16 March – Week 7 (Phase 1)
 Ahoy, Rotterdam

23 March – Week 8 (Phase 1)
 Manchester Arena, Manchester

30 March – Week 9 (Phase 1) – Judgement Night
 Motorpoint Arena Cardiff, Cardiff

*Kim Huybrechts was unable to travel to Cardiff due to family reasons. Because he was already eliminated in week 8, Peter Wright was awarded the win by default and the game was not rescheduled, giving Wright the night off.

6 April – Week 10 (Phase 2)
 3Arena, Dublin

13 April – Week 11 (Phase 2)
 Echo Arena Liverpool, Liverpool

20 April – Week 12 (Phase 2)
 SSE Arena Belfast, Belfast

27 April – Week 13 (Phase 2)
 Barclaycard Arena, Birmingham

4 May – Week 14 (Phase 2)
 Sheffield Arena, Sheffield

11 May – Week 15 (Phase 2)

 GE Oil and Gas Arena, Aberdeen

Play-offs – 18 May

 The O2 Arena, London

Table and streaks

Table
After the first nine weeks (phase 1), the bottom two in the table are eliminated. In the next six weeks (phase 2) the eight remaining players each play a further seven matches. The top four players then compete in the playoffs.

Two points are awarded for a win and one point for a draw. When players are tied on points, leg difference is used first as a tie-breaker, after that legs won against throw and then tournament average.

{| class="wikitable sortable" style="text-align:center;"
|-
! style="width:10px;" abbr="Position"|#
! width=200 |Name
! style="width:20px;" abbr="Played"|Pld
! style="width:20px;" abbr="Won"|W
! style="width:20px;" abbr="Drawn"|D
! style="width:20px;" abbr="Lost"|L
! style="width:20px;" abbr="Points"|Pts 
! style="width:20px;" abbr="Legs for"|LF
! style="width:20px;" abbr="Legs against"|LA
! style="width:20px;" abbr="Leg difference"|+/-
! style="width:20px;" abbr="Legs won against throw"|LWAT
! style="width:20px;" abbr="Tons"|100+
! style="width:20px;" abbr="Ton plus"|140+
! style="width:20px;" abbr="Maximums"|180s
! style="width:20px;" abbr="Average"|A
! style="width:20px;" abbr="High checkout"|HC
! style="width:20px;" abbr="Checkout percentage"|C%

|- style="background:#ccffcc;"
!1
|align=left|  || 16 || 10 || 4 || 2 ||24|| 102 || 70 || +32 || 34 || 174 || 154 || 54 || 104.92 || 170 || 40.54%
|- style="background:#ccffcc;"
!2
|align=left|   RU || 16 || 10 || 3 || 3 ||23|| 98 || 68 || +30 || 30 || 203 || 144 || 46 || 98.86 || 156 || 38.89%
|- style="background:#ccffcc;"
!3
|align=left|   || 16 || 8 || 3 || 5 ||19|| 92 || 85 || +7 || 32 || 206 || 133 || 37 || 98.15 || 142 || 40.17%
|- style="background:#ccffcc;"
!4
|align=left|   || 16 || 7 || 4 || 5 ||18|| 91 || 79 || +12 || 35 || 192 || 127 || 53 || 102.16 || 170 || 39.91%
|- style="background:#cccffc;"
!5
|align=left|   || 16 || 6 || 4 || 6 ||16|| 82 || 87 || −5 || 25 || 166 || 107 || 65 || 99.76 || 160 || 39.47%
|- style="background:#cccffc;"
!6
|align=left|  || 16 || 6 || 2 || 8 ||14|| 79 || 89 || −10 || 26 || 186 || 131 || 58 || 98.69 || 156 || 37.09%
|- style="background:#cccffc;"
!7
|align=left|   || 16 || 5 || 3 || 8 ||13|| 82 || 95 || −13 || 23 || 278 || 133 || 28 || 95.29 || 121 || 37.36%
|- style="background:#cccffc
!8
|align=left|   || 16 || 6 || 1 || 9 ||13|| 76 || 90 || −14 || 25 || 197 || 122 || 46 || 96.84 || 170 || 36.89%
|- style="background:#fcc;"
!9
|align=left|   || 9 || 1 || 1 || 7 ||3|| 42 || 58 || −16 || 15 || 120 || 51 || 19 || 92.30 || 152 || 34.71%
|- style="background:#fcc;"
!10
|align=left|   || 9 || 0 || 3 || 6 ||3|| 37 || 60 || −23 || 11 || 93 || 70 || 24 || 95.58 || 140 || 34.58%

Streaks

Positions by Week

References

External links
 PDC Professional Darts Corporation, official website
 PDC Professional Darts Corporation, official website, Tournaments

Premier League Darts
Premier League
Premier League